The 48th G7 summit was held from 26 to 28 June 2022 in Schloss Elmau, Krün, Bavarian Alps, Germany. Germany previously hosted a G7 summit in 2015 at Schloss Elmau.

Leaders at the summit 
The 2022 summit was the first summit for German Chancellor Olaf Scholz and Japanese Prime Minister Fumio Kishida. It was also the last summit for British Prime Minister Boris Johnson and Italian Prime Minister Mario Draghi.

Participants and representatives

Gallery of participating leaders

Invited guests

Agenda 

The following agenda items were discussed.

26 June 2022
 Global economy
 Partnerships for infrastructure and investment
 Foreign and security policy

27 June 2022
 With Ukrainian president Volodymyr Zelenskyy (virtual): The statement on support for Ukraine was issued.

 "Investing in a Better Future" on climate, energy and health with G7 partner countries and international organizations: UK announced £25 million of UK aid backing for a new fund to ensure the world is better prepared to defeat future pandemics.

 Global food security, gender equality with G7 partner countries and international organizations with the outreach guests: Japan prepared a plan to provide about 200 million dollars to help address a global food crisis amid Russia's ongoing invasion of Ukraine. The statement on global food security was issued.

28 June 2022
 Multilateral and digital order
 Preparing for the 2022 G20 Bali summit

G7 Leaders' Communiqué was issued after the summit meetings.

Events leading to the summit 
On 19 February 2022, G7 Foreign Ministers' Meeting was held with the participation of Foreign Minister of Ukraine, and issued a statement on Russia and Ukraine.

In March 2022, foreign ministers from G7 agreed to impose tougher sanctions on Russia if it does not stop its assault on Ukraine, and demanded in particular that Moscow halt attacks in the vicinity of nuclear power plants.
German Chancellor Olaf Scholz invited leaders from the G7 to a summit on 24 March 2022 in Brussels, Belgium.
The meeting was embedded in the NATO summit and the European Council.
World leaders warned that if Russia were to use chemical or nuclear weapons they would be forced to respond.

On 7 April 2022, G7 Foreign Ministers' meeting was held in Brussels to discuss about the situation of Ukraine, and issued their statement reaffirming that they will take additional measures against Russia until the country stops its invasion of Ukraine.
On the day, leaders of the Group of Seven also issued a statement amid growing calls for Russia to be held accountable for the civilian killings.
And on 19 April 2022, the leaders met and discussed at a videoconference about their coordinated efforts to impose severe economic costs to hold Russia accountable.

On 8 May 2022, the leaders discussed at a videoconference, and issued a joint statement saying that they will reinforce Russia's economic isolation. After meeting virtually with Ukrainian President Volodymyr Zelenskyy, they committed to phasing out dependency on Russian energy.
And on 9 May 2022, the G7 foreign ministers and the High Representative of the EU gave a statement on the selection process for the 2022 Hong Kong Chief Executive election.
On 14 May 2022, they issued another statement on Russia's war against Ukraine, and pressed China to put real pressure on Russia.

After the summit 
In September 2022, the leaders of G7 condemned the "sham" Russian referendums being carried out in occupied Ukraine as a "phony" pretext to illegally grab territory.

On 11 October 2022, after the Russia's missile strikes in Ukraine, the leaders of G7 held an online meeting with Ukrainian President Volodymyr Zelenskyy, and issued a statement on Ukraine.

On 16 November, after the then assumed Russian rockets hit Poland (later proven to be Ukrainian defense missiles) during the period of the 2022 G20 Bali summit, an emergency meeting of G7 and NATO was held.

On 12 December, G7 leaders held a virtual meeting and issued a statement to focus on boosting Ukraine's air defense.
Also, it was announced that G7 created an open, international climate club and invited interested countries that pursue ambitious climate policies to join it.

See also 
 2022 Russian invasion of Ukraine
 2022 Brussels extraordinary summit
 2022 Madrid summit
 2022 G20 Bali summit

Reference list

External links 

Official website
Website of the protests against the summit

2022 conferences
2022 in international relations
2020s in Bavaria
21st-century diplomatic conferences (Global)
Diplomatic conferences in Germany
2022
June 2022 events in Germany
Scholz cabinet